Mykhailo Hrushevskyi Street or simply Hrushevskyi Street is a street in central Kyiv, the capital of Ukraine.

The street is named after Ukrainian academician, politician, historian, and statesman Mykhailo Hrushevsky. Hrushevsky wrote his first academic book on the history of Bar, Ukraine, titled Bar Starostvo: Historical Notes: XV-XVIII.  

Mykhailo Hrushevskyi Street is located in the government quarter Lypky neighborhood of the Pecherskyi District. It houses the Supreme Council Building, Government Building and the Parliamentary Library. It is adjacent to Mariinskyi Park which contains Constitution Square.

The street acts as a border between the Pechersk and Lypky neighborhoods. At the European Square this street connects to Old Kyiv. There is a noticeable ascend that starts at the European Square and continues on all the way to the intersection with Garden Street next to the Government Building.

History

The street was established sometime in the 1810s as part of bigger Alexander Street which included such modern streets as Sahaidachny Street, Volodymyr Descent, Museum Lane. The street was established along an old Ruthenian path called "Ivanivsky Road". After the return of the Soviets to Kyiv in 1919, the whole Alexander Street was renamed Revolution street. After the transfer of capital from Kharkiv to Kyiv in 1934, the street was split and today's Hrushevskyi portion was renamed as Kirov Street.

It is one of the main sites of the Euromaidan protests in 2014.

Connecting streets
 Peter's Alley
 Museum Lane
 Serf's Lane (Kriposny provulok)
 Garden Street
 Silken Street
 Linden Street
 Constitution Square (pedestrian plaza)

Attractions

 Khreshchaty Park
 City Park
 Mariinskyi Park
 Kyiv Academic Puppet Theatre
 Valeriy Lobanovskyi Dynamo Stadium

Monuments
 Monument to Valeriy Lobanovsky
 Monument to Grigory Petrovsky (demolished in 2009)
 Nikolai Vatutin monument (demolished in 2023)

Research institutions and museums
 Water information center
 National Art Museum of Ukraine
 Ostap Vyshnia Library
 National Parliamentary Library of Ukraine
 National Academy of Sciences of Ukraine building
 Institute of History of Ukraine
 Taras Shevchenko Institute of Literature
 Oleksandr Potebnia Institute of Language Studies
 All-Ukrainian Society of Regional Researchers
 Ukrainian Association of historians of science

Government institutions
 Library of Supreme Council of Ukraine
 Central House of Officers (Armed Forces of Ukraine, formerly House of Red Army)
 Central Museum of Armed Forces of Ukraine (formerly Historical Museum of Kyiv District Troops)
 Library of the Cultural, educational and welfare center of Armed Forces of Ukraine
 Society of Officers of Ukraine
 Budynok Uryadu
 Cabinet of Ukraine
 Ministry of Finance
 Ministry of Economic Development and Trade
 Embassy of China, Kyiv
 Verkhovna Rada building
 Hotel Kyiv

See also
 Euromaidan

Further reading

References

External links
 Hrushevskyi Street at the Kyiv web-encyclopedia .
 Hrushevskoho Mykhaila (Грушевського Михайла). Collection of landmarks of history and culture.
 Mark Estabrook photographs of the Euromaidan Revolution. 

Streets in Kyiv
Pecherskyi District